George Collins may refer to:

Politics
 George Collins (Nova Scotia politician) (1771–1813), Canadian mariner, merchant, and politician
 George Collins (Australian politician) (1839–1926), Tasmanian politician
 George W. Collins (1925–1972), U.S. Representative from Illinois

Sports
 George Collins (cricketer, born 1851) (1851–1905), English cricketer
 George Collins (cricketer, born 1889) (1889–1949), English cricketer
 George Collins (footballer) (fl. 1919–1936), English football manager from 1919 to 1936
 George Collins (baseball) (fl. 1923–1925), American Negro league baseball player
 George Collins (American football) (born 1955), American football player

Others
 G. Pat Collins (1895–1959), American actor, also known as George Pat Collins
 George R. Collins (1917–1993), American art historian
 George E. Collins (1928–2017), American mathematician, one of the founders of computer algebra